Maicon Pereira Roque (born 14 September 1988), known simply as Maicon, is a Brazilian professional footballer who plays as a central defender for Santos.

He spent most of his career with Porto, appearing in 183 games and winning 11 honours, including three Primeira Liga titles and the UEFA Europa League in 2011. Previously of Nacional, he totalled 144 games in Portugal's top flight. He additionally played for two years at São Paulo, and won the Süper Lig with Turkey's Galatasaray in 2018.

Club career

Cruzeiro
Born in Barretos, São Paulo, Maicon started off his career with Cruzeiro. He made his first-team debut on 6 May 2007, coming on as a second-half substitute for fellow youth graduate Wellington in a 2–0 home win against rivals Atlético Mineiro in the second leg of the Campeonato Mineiro finals, lost 4–2 on aggregate.

In 2008, Maicon moved on loan to modest Cabofriense. Upon returning, he was a part of Cruzeiro's reserves that went on a trip to Portugal and played three friendlies in the country.

Maicon had his first abroad adventure in the 2008–09 campaign, being a defensive mainstay for Madeira's Nacional which again qualified for European competition.

Porto

On 4 June 2009, Maicon moved to Primeira Liga champions Porto in a contract running until 2014. He appeared in only four games in his first year, starting with a 2–1 home victory over Rio Ave on 29 November; on 24 April 2010 he scored a first goal in a 5–2 away defeat of Vitória de Setúbal.

After Bruno Alves left for Zenit, Maicon became a first-team regular in 2010–11, playing 37 competitive matches as Porto won the treble (including eight in the victorious run in the UEFA Europa League). In the following season – under new manager Vítor Pereira – after Cristian Săpunaru's injury, he beat competition from Jorge Fucile and began being often utilised as a right-back.

On 2 March 2012, after a free kick, Maicon headed a late goal in a 3–2 away win over Benfica. He scored five goals from 35 appearances over two seasons, helping his team to back-to-back national championships; in October he was awarded the Dragão de Ouro as the club's Player of the Year.

Maicon made his only appearance for the reserves in Segunda Liga on 3 February 2013, and scored a free kick from his own half in the 3–1 home victory against Oliveirense. He headed home the 2–1 winner over Chelsea in the group stage of the UEFA Champions League on 29 September 2015, in what was his third competitive goal of the campaign.

São Paulo
On 14 February 2016, having been deemed surplus to requirements by new manager José Peseiro, Maicon was loaned to São Paulo; upon arriving, he stated that the move was "a dream come true". He made his debut in the Campeonato Paulista on 1 March in a 2–0 home win against Mogi Mirim. On 2 April, he missed a penalty before scoring the last-minute winner in a 2–1 victory over Oeste at the Estádio do Morumbi.

Maicon signed a permanent deal for R$22 million on 28 June 2016, as Porto also ceded 50% of the sporting rights to fellow defenders Inácio and Lucão.

Galatasaray
In July 2017, Maicon returned to European football, signing a four-year deal for Galatasaray for a fee of €7 million. He scored a career-best five goals – all in the first half of the campaign – as the team from Istanbul won the Süper Lig in his first season, including two on 30 September in a 3–2 home win against Kardemir Karabükspor.

Al Nassr
On 5 February 2019, Al Nassr paid €1.7 million to gain Maicon on loan for 18 months. The Saudi Professional League club paid a further €1.4 million to sign him permanently in August 2020. In the 2019 Saudi Super Cup on 4 January 2020, he scored the decisive attempt in the side's shootout defeat of Al Taawoun (1–1 after 120 minutes).

Maicon joined permanently in 2020, but terminated his contract on 19 June 2021.

Return to Cruzeiro
On 25 November 2021, Maicon returned to his first club Cruzeiro after agreeing to a three-year deal. However, a directorial change caused him to terminate his link after just three matches.

Santos
On 8 March 2022, just hours after leaving Cruzeiro, Maicon signed a two-year contract with Santos. He made his debut on 5 April, starting in a 1–0 Copa Sudamericana away loss against Banfield.

Personal life
Maicon hailed from a family of footballers: his father Maurides played amateur football, while his younger brothers Muller and Maurides were professionals, the former as a forward and the latter also as a stopper. Maicon faced Maurides twice in the 2015–16 season, when his sibling was a member of Arouca.

In Brazil, Maicon was given the nickname God of Zaga, due to his play and resemblance to Kratos from the videogame series God of War.

Club statistics

Honours
Porto
Primeira Liga: 2010–11, 2011–12, 2012–13
Taça de Portugal: 2009–10, 2010–11
Supertaça Cândido de Oliveira: 2009, 2010, 2011, 2012, 2013
UEFA Europa League: 2010–11
UEFA Super Cup runner-up: 2011
Taça da Liga runner-up: 2009–10, 2012–13

Galatasaray
Süper Lig: 2017–18

Al Nassr
Saudi Professional League: 2018–19
Saudi Super Cup: 2019

Individual
FC Porto Player of the Year: 2012

References

External links

1988 births
Living people
Brazilian footballers
Footballers from São Paulo (state)
Association football defenders
Campeonato Brasileiro Série A players
Cruzeiro Esporte Clube players
Associação Desportiva Cabofriense players
São Paulo FC players
Santos FC players
Primeira Liga players
Liga Portugal 2 players
C.D. Nacional players
FC Porto players
FC Porto B players
Süper Lig players
Galatasaray S.K. footballers
Saudi Professional League players
Al Nassr FC players
UEFA Europa League winning players
Brazilian expatriate footballers
Expatriate footballers in Portugal
Expatriate footballers in Turkey
Expatriate footballers in Saudi Arabia
Brazilian expatriate sportspeople in Portugal
Brazilian expatriate sportspeople in Turkey
Brazilian expatriate sportspeople in Saudi Arabia